Momokomotion (Momoko Ueda) is a Japanese multi-instrumentalist/singer/songwriter/artist based in Bangkok.

History

After attending the San Francisco Art Institute, Momoko became a member of the Bangkok-based electroclash band Futon (as Momoko Futon).

In 2007, and now known as Momokomotion, she recorded her first solo album, Punk In A Coma.

In late 2007, Momoko Ueda and guitarist-artist Tintin Cooper, alumni of the Slade School of Fine Art, took part in Tokyo Wonder Site's 'Creator in Residence' scheme in Shibuya, Tokyo while also performing for Tokyo DAF (Digital Arts Festival) in an art installation created by Bangkok-based design team Duckunit.

Band Members Past/Present

Momokomotion – Guitar, Vocals
Tintin Cooper – Guitar
Dr Usui—Guitar
Orawin Watcharapong – Bass
Patrice Schneider—Drums
Anna Voronoff – Drums
Mark - Keyboards

Discography

Punk In A Coma (Rambutan Records) 2007
 Toy (with Bo Surattanawee) (Rambutan Records)

External links
Official Momokomotion MySpace Site
Tintin Cooper Artist Site
Tokyo Wonder Site, Creator in Residence Tintin Cooper- Momokomotion
Patrice Schneider Website
Bed Supperclub
The Lam Morrison House Of Rock
BK Magazine Momokomotion Interview

References

Japanese multi-instrumentalists
Japanese women singer-songwriters
Japanese singer-songwriters
Living people
California Institute of the Arts alumni
Place of birth missing (living people)
Year of birth missing (living people)
21st-century Japanese singers
21st-century Japanese women singers